Scipione Ammirato (October 7, 1531January 11, 1601) was an Italian historian and philosopher. He is now regarded as an important founding figure in the scholarly study of the history of philosophy. He is best known for his political treatise Discorsi sopra Cornelio Tacito (Discourses on Tacitus), published in 1594. The book soon became “an international classic” with numerous translations.

In his Discorsi Ammirato presents himself as an anti-Machiavellian from the start, leaving no stone unturned in his efforts to confute the main theses of Il Principe. Unlike Botero and Lipsius, Ammirato did not see Tacitism as a surrogate form of Machiavellianism. On the contrary, his Discorsi present the works of the Roman historian as an antidote to Il Principe, and this approach was to prove widely popular during the long Tacitus revival.

Moreover, Ammirato's doctrine of reason of state defined such “reason” as violating neither natural nor divine law; it was the reason of the greater public good (such as public safety) and thus, in departing from the ordinary moral order in extraordinary circumstances, the modern prince did not come into conflict with Christianity.

Biography 
Ammirato was born at Lecce in the Kingdom of Naples in 1531, of a family originally from Florence. In 1547, He was sent to Naples to study law, but he soon turned to literature instead. In 1551 he received the minor orders from the Bishop of Lecce Braccio Martelli, who appointed him a canon of Lecce Cathedral. He afterwards travelled, or rather wandered, about Italy in quest of occupation; he resided some time at Venice, Rome, and Naples; returned to his native country, Ammirato was temporarily employed by several noblemen, and was sent by the Archbishop of Naples on a mission to Pope Pius V. It was a flourishing period in the history of papal Rome. Sixtus V was about to initiate “a program of urban development without parallel in any other European city.” Intellectual life was lively and characterized by a “new humanism.” There Ammirato associated with the humanist Giovanni Pietro Maffei, the philosopher Franciscus Patricius, and the Piedmontese political writer Giovanni Botero. In 1569 he fixed his residence at Florence, where the Grand Duke Cosimo I offered him a position as state historiographer at the respectable salary of 300 scudi a year, and Cardinal Ferdinando de' Medici gave him the use of his own country house at La Petraia. Ammirato became a member of the Florentine Accademia degli Alterati, under the pseudonym Il Trasformato (“The Transformed”). In 1595 he was made canon of the Cathedral of Florence. He died in 1601.

Works 
Ammirato was a very copious writer; the following are those of his works which deserve notice:

 Delle Famiglie Nobili Napoletane, a genealogical work in two parts, folio, the first of which was in 1580, and the second in 1651, after the author's death;
  Ammirato invoked Tacitus to refute Machiavelli's republicanism and composed his Discorsi as a counter to Machiavelli's Discourses on Livy. Ammirato also condemns Machiavelli for having subjugated the Christian religion to the demands of the state. Rather than adjust religion to fit themselves, he writes, men, and especially princes, must adjust laws to fit religion, «since in the nature of men in the fields and the caverns, before cities were built, there was a belief in God sooner than there were civil gatherings, on behalf of which laws were made; because it would not otherwise be necessary to say that religion should accommodate to civil life, than who might say that seasons of the year should change to fit individuals rather than the other way round.»  Ammirato's Discorsi sopra Cornelio Tacito went through four Italian editions before 1599 and two more at the beginning of the next century. They were translated into Latin for the benefit of German readers in 1609 and 1618 and appeared in French translations twice in 1618 and in 1628, 1633, and 1642; John Nichols claimed that Thomas Gordon's commentaries on Tacitus were derivative from the work of Virgilio Malvezzi, Scipione Ammirato and Baltasar Alamos de Barrientos.
 Orazioni a diversi Principi intorno a' Preparamenti che s'avrebbero a fare contro la Potenza del Turco, 1598;
 Il Rota ovvero delle Imprese, 1562; a treatise upon heraldic devices; this work took the form of dialogue, named in honor of one its interlocutors, Berardino Rota, who was a distinguished Neapolitan poet and friend of the author.
 Istorie Fiorentine, in two parts. Part I, consisting of twenty books, comes down to the year 1434, when Cosimo de' Medici, styled Pater Patriae, returned from his exile, and it was published in 1600, in 1 vol. fol. Part II, in fifteen books, to the year 1574, was published 1641, in 1 vol. fol., by Ammirato the younger, and dedicated to the Grand Duke Ferdinando II. Ammirato the younger published also in 1647 a second and improved edition of the first part, with additions, in 2 vols fol. Ammirato's history of Florence is considered the most accurate and complete of its kind. The Accademia della Crusca called him "the modern Livy". Ammirato, was highly critical of Machiavelli's Florentine Histories; he said that Machiavelli «altered names, twisted facts, confounded cases, increased, added, subtracted, diminished and did anything that suited his fancy without checking, without lawful restraint and what is more, he seems to have done so occasionally on purpose!»;

 Delle Famiglie nobili Fiorentine, completed and published in 1615 by Ammirato the younger, in fol.
 Rime spirituali sopra salmi, Venice, 1634;
  These are biographical notices of the bishops of those three sees;
 Opuscoli, being a collection of his minor works, in 3 vols, 1637-1642. They contain orations addressed to several princes and popes, biographies of King Ladislaus and his sister Joanna II of Naples, and of several distinguished members of house of Medici; treatises, short poems, and dialogues. Most important among them is the dialogue Dedalione, published in the third volume of the Opuscoli (1642), in which the seer Tiresias answers the objections raised by Daedalion against poetry, basing his argument on certain passages in Plato. Ammirato dedicated his Dedalione to his patron, cardinal Girolamo Seripando;
 Albero e Storia dei Guidi coll'Aggiunte di Scipione Ammirato il Giovane, fol. 1640, and again, with additions, in 1650. The Counts Guidi acted an important part in the early history of Florence;
 Discorsi delle Famiglie Paladina e Antoglietta, 1595. Ammirato was a laborious and accurate investigator of genealogical notices, and his works on these subjects are very valuable as materials for history. He states that he examined fifty thousand papers for his work on the Neapolitan families, and six thousand for those of Florence. These works are now become very scarce.

Ammirato left also several manuscript works, among others a continuation of the Monte Cassino Chronicle, and his own autobiography, which is kept in the library of Santa Maria la Nuova of Florence.

Scipione Ammirato the younger, above mentioned, but whose real name was Cristoforo del Bianco, was born at Montaione in Tuscany about 1582; he acted as amanuensis to Ammirato in the latter part of his life, and was made his heir by will, on the condition of assuming his name and surname. He edited several of the posthumous works of his benefactor.

References

Notes

Bibliography

 
 
 
 
 
 
 
 
 De Mattei, Rodolfo, Varia fortuna di Scipione Ammirato; Opere a stampa di Scipione Ammirato; Codici di Scipione Ammirato, in "Studi salentini", 8 (1960), pp. 352–407.
 Schellhase, Kenneth C. (1976). Tacitus in Renaissance Political Thought, Chicago: University of Chicago Press, pp. 142–5.

See also

 Francesco Guicciardini
 Niccolò Machiavelli
 Republicanism
 Italian Renaissance

1531 births
1601 deaths
People from Lecce
Italian political scientists
16th-century Italian philosophers
16th-century Italian historians
Italian Renaissance writers
Italian genealogists
Political philosophers
Italian-language writers
University of Naples Federico II alumni
Political realists
Italian Renaissance humanists